The 1967 Campeonato Gaúcho was the 47th season of Rio Grande do Sul's top association football league. Grêmio won their 18th title.

Format 

The championship was contested by the twelve teams in a double round-robin system, with the team with the most points winning the title and qualifying to the 1967 Taça Brasil. The last placed team would be relegated to the 1968 Second Division, but was spared from relegation year after the Rio Grande do Sul's FA deciding that the 1968 season was going to be contested by 18 teams.

Teams 

A. Novo Hamburgo was known as Floriano from 1942 until 1968.

Championship

References

Campeonato Gaúcho seasons
1965 in Brazilian football leagues